Annapurna I Central is a subsidiary peak of Annapurna I Main located in Nepal.

References

Eight-thousanders of the Himalayas
Mountains of the Gandaki Province